Luteimonas marina is a bacterium. Its type strain is FR1330(T) (=KCTC 12327(T) =JCM 12488(T) =IMSNU 60306(T)).

References

Further reading
Whitman, William B., et al., eds. Bergey’s Manual® of Systematic Bacteriology. Vol. 2. Springer, 2012.

External links

LPSN
WORMS
Type strain of Luteimonas marina at BacDive -  the Bacterial Diversity Metadatabase

Xanthomonadales
Gram-negative bacteria
Bacteria described in 2008